Events during the year 1987 in Northern Ireland.

Incumbents
 Secretary of State - Tom King

Events
8 May - Loughgall ambush: The British Army Special Air Service (SAS) kills 8 Provisional Irish Republican Army (IRA) members and a civilian in an ambush at Loughgall.
3 July - Richard Branson and Per Lindstrand become the first people to complete a transatlantic flight in a hot air balloon aboard the balloon Virgin Atlantic Flyer, first touching down in Northern Ireland.
8 November - Remembrance Day bombing: 11 civilians are killed in an IRA explosion during a Remembrance Day service in Enniskillen.
5 December - Downpatrick & Ardglass Railway begins public operation, the first Irish gauge heritage railway in Ireland.

Arts and literature
Ciarán Carson's The Irish for No poetry collection is published and wins the Alice Hunt Bartlett Award.

Sport

Football
Irish League
Winners: Linfield

Irish Cup
Winners: Glentoran 1 - 0 Larne

Warrenpoint Town F.C. formed.

Motorcycling
Robert Dunlop wins the 125cc, 350cc and 1000cc races at the Cookstown 100 to be named “Man of the Meeting”.

Births
2 January - Daryl Fordyce, footballer.
21 February - Carl Frampton, boxer.
2 March - Jonathan Rea, motorcycle racer.
4 July - Jason Smyth, paralympian sprinter.
29 August - Tony Kane, footballer.
16 September - Kyle Lafferty, international soccer player.
17 September - Greg Thompson, cricketer.
6 October - Michael O'Connor, footballer.
25 October - Darron Gibson, footballer.

Deaths
27 April - Maurice Gibson, judge (born 1913).
7 May - Colin Blakely, actor (born 1930).
8 May - Patrick Joseph Kelly, Commander of the Provisional IRA East Tyrone Brigade, killed by Special Air Service at Loughgall (born 1957).
22 June - John Hewitt, poet (born 1907).
3 December - George Seawright, Loyalist politician.
22 December - John McMichael, leading Ulster Defence Association member, killed in car bomb attack.

Full date unknown
Alan Barnes, architect.
Jimmy Warnock, boxer (born 1912).

See also
1987 in England
1987 in Scotland
1987 in Wales

References

 
Northern Ireland